Damir Žutić (Lithuanian: Damiras Žutičius; born 22 July 1993 in Croatia) is a Croatian footballer who most recently played for NK Rudeš.

Career
Žutić started his senior career with HNK Gorica, where he made five appearances and scored zero goals in the Croatian First Football League. After that, he moved abroad to play for Lithuanian side Atlantas Klaipeda in 2019. He left Atlantas in January 2020.

References

External links
 'I don't mind strangers coming in if they are of good quality, and here in my new environment I was very amazed by the pre-training shower ritual!'
 Having a coffee with Zuc: 'In Lithuania, my fans came knocking on my door... and giving me support!'
 My Lithuanian story: 'They call me Tony, I learn to cook, and they walk on the streets - planes!' 
 Atlantic defender Damiras Žutičius: "It will not be easy in Panevėžys"

1993 births
Living people
Association football fullbacks
Croatian footballers
HNK Gorica players
FK Atlantas players
NK Rudeš players
First Football League (Croatia) players
Croatian Football League players
A Lyga players
Croatian expatriate footballers
Croatian expatriate sportspeople in Lithuania